D.100 is a west to east state road in Turkey. It starts at Kapıkule, the Bulgarian border check point, and ends in Gürbulak, the Iranian border check point. Since it runs all the way from west to east it crosses most of the north to south state roads including D.650, D.750, D.850 and D.950.

Itinerary

Helicopter crash

On March 10, 2017, a Sikorsky S-76 helicopter owned by Swan Aviation hit the antenna of the Endem TV Tower in heavy fog and crashed onto the State Road D100. All seven people on board were killed.

References and notes

External links

AH1
100
Transport in Edirne Province
Transport in Kırklareli Province
Transport in Tekirdağ Province
Transport in Kocaeli Province
Transport in Sakarya Province
Transport in Bolu Province
Transport in Çankırı Province
Transport in Çorum Province
Transport in Amasya Province
Transport in Tokat Province
Transport in Sivas Province
Transport in Erzincan Province
Transport in Erzurum Province
Transport in Ağrı Province
Transport in Istanbul Province
Transport in Kadıköy